The 2011 New Jersey State Senate elections were held on November 4.

The election took place midway through Chris Christie's first term as Governor of New Jersey. No seats changed hands, though Democrats had gained one seat in a 2010 special election with Linda Greenstein's victory over Tom Goodwin. Three incumbents retired from the Senate including Sean Kean, who was redistricted into Jennifer Beck's district and ran for Assembly rather than challenge her.

Incumbents not running for re-election

Democratic 

 John Girgenti (District 35)

Republican 

 Andrew Ciesla (District 10)
 Sean T. Kean (District 11) (ran for Assembly)

Summary of results by State Senate district

District 1

District 2

District 3

District 4

District 5

District 6

District 7

District 8

District 9

District 10

District 11

District 12

District 13

District 14

District 15

District 16

District 17

District 18

District 19

District 20

District 21

District 22

District 23

District 24

District 25

District 26

District 27

District 28

District 29

District 30

District 31

District 32

District 33

District 34

District 35

District 36

District 37

District 38

District 39

District 40

References 

New Jersey State Senate elections
New Jersey State Senate
state senate